The Ellen Burstyn Show is an American sitcom starring Ellen Burstyn. The series was produced by Touchstone Television and debuted on ABC on September 20, 1986. The series was canceled after 13 episodes.

Synopsis
Burstyn played Baltimore college professor Ellen Brewer, who sometimes had to deal not only with the students she has to tutor, but also with her meddling mother, Sydney (played by fellow veteran Broadway/film actress Elaine Stritch, who was only 7 years older than Burstyn), her divorced daughter, Molly (Megan Mullally) and her 5 year old grandson, Nick (played by Jesse Tendler).

Cast

Cancellation
The series debuted on September 20, 1986, and ran until November 15, 1986. It was cancelled after eight episodes but returned in August of 1987 to burn off the remaining five episodes. The final episode aired on September 5, 1987, ranking as the third-lowest-rated series on network television (81st out of 83 shows, with a 7.6/13 rating/share).

Episodes

References

External links

1986 American television series debuts
1987 American television series endings
1980s American sitcoms
American Broadcasting Company original programming
Television shows set in Baltimore
English-language television shows
Television series by ABC Studios